First Light of Dawn is a 2000 Italian drama film written and directed by Lucio Gaudino. It was entered into the main competition at the 50th Berlin International Film Festival. For their performances, Gianmarco Tognazzi e Francesco Giuffrida were both nominated for Nastro d'Argento for Best Actor.

Plot

Cast
 Laura Morante as Anna
 Francesco Giuffrida as Saro
 Gianmarco Tognazzi as Edo
 Vittorio Ciorcalo as the doorman
 Ninni Bruschetta as Mirko Zappalà
 Francesca Chiarantonio as the doorman's daughter
 Roberto Nobile as Nino Procida

See also
List of Italian films of 2000

References

External links
 
 
2000 films
Italian drama films
2000 drama films
Films set in Sicily
2000s Italian films